Cheeze (Hangul: 치즈) was a South Korean band formed in 2011. They released their first album, Recipe, on April 16, 2013. In latter 2016 Dalchong was the only remaining member of Cheeze, thus leading to the group's disbandment and Cheeze becoming a solo artist.

Members
Dalchong – vocalist

Previous members 

Yasu – rapper
Moodi – producer
Cloud – producer

Discography

Studio albums

Extended plays

Singles

References

South Korean indie rock groups
Musical groups from Seoul
Musical groups established in 2011
2011 establishments in South Korea
Musical groups disestablished in 2016
2016 disestablishments in South Korea